Dahaneh Morghak (also known as Dahaneh and Dahneh) is a village in Deh Bakri Rural District, in the Central District of Bam County, Kerman Province, Iran. At the 2006 census, its population was 251, in 70 families.

References 

Populated places in Bam County